The 2021–22 Ferris State Bulldogs men's ice hockey season was the 47th season of play for the program and the 36th season in the Central Collegiate Hockey Association (CCHA). The team represented Ferris State University, was coached by Bob Daniels in his 30th season and played their home games at Ewigleben Arena.

Season
Ferris State joined with six other members of the WCHA to restart the CCHA for the 2021–22 season. Ferris State was eager to leave the previous season behind after posting one of the worst records in the history of college hockey. Straight away, the team's offense looked much better, scoring four goals in each of their first two games and equaling their win total from the previous season after just the first weekend.

While the Bulldogs put up several more wins over the succeeding month, including over #2 Minnesota State, the team was being let down by subpar goaltending. After going through an 8-game losing skid in November, where they surrendered at least 5 goals against on 5 occasions, head coach Bob Daniels knew something had to be done. He was able to lure Noah Giesbrecht from Windsor after the fall semester and the team began to respond to the new netminder. Giesbrecht put together a solid stretch and helped the Bulldogs produce their only weekend sweep of the season, downing Bemidji State in late-January. Giesbrecht would end up sharing the goal with senior Logan Stein by the end of the season and Ferris State ended the year with 11 wins, 10 more than they had all of the previous year.

The Bulldogs' goaltenders shone in the postseason, turning aside a barrage of shots from Michigan Tech in both games. While the team managed to push the Huskies into overtime twice, they weren't able to get the final goal on either occasion.

Departures

Recruiting

Roster
As of January 10, 2022.

Standings

Schedule and results

|-
!colspan=12 style=";" | Regular Season

|-
!colspan=12 style=";" | 

|- align="center" bgcolor="#e0e0e0"
|colspan=12|Ferris State Lost Series 0–2

Scoring statistics

Goaltending statistics

Rankings

Note: USCHO did not release a poll in week 24.

Awards and honors

References

2021-22
Ferris State
Ferris State
Ferris State Bulldogs ice hockey, men's
Ferris State Bulldogs ice hockey, men's